The 1991 NCAA Division II Men's Soccer Championship was the 20th annual tournament held by the NCAA to determine the top men's Division II college soccer program in the United States.

Florida Tech defeated Sonoma State, 5–1, to win a second national title. The Panthers (19-2-1) were coached by Rick Stottler.

The final match was held in Melbourne, Florida on December 7, 1991.

Bracket

Final

See also  
 NCAA Division I Men's Soccer Championship
 1991 NCAA Division II Women's Soccer Tournament
 NCAA Division III Men's Soccer Championship
 NAIA Men's Soccer Championship

References 

NCAA Division II Men's Soccer Championship
NCAA Division II Men's Soccer Championship
NCAA Division II Men's Soccer Championship
NCAA Division II Men's Soccer Championship